The aza-Diels–Alder reaction converts imines and dienes to tetrahydropyridines. This organic reaction is a modification of the Diels–Alder reaction. The nitrogen atom can be part of the diene or the dienophile.

The imine is often generated in situ from an amine and formaldehyde. An example is the reaction of cyclopentadiene with benzylamine to an aza norbornene.

In the enantioselective Diels–Alder (DA) reaction of an aniline, formaldehyde and a cyclohexenone catalyzed by (S)-proline even the diene is masked. 

The catalytic cycle starts with the reactions of the aromatic amine with formaldehyde to the imine and the reaction of the ketone with proline to the diene. The second step, an endo trig cyclisation, is driven to one of the two possible enantiomers (99% ee) because the imine nitrogen atom forms a hydrogen bond with the carboxylic acid group of proline on the Si face. Hydrolysis of the final complex releases the product and regenerates the catalyst.

In 2014, Doyle and coworkers reported a Zn(OTf)2-catalyzed [4+2] cycloaddition reaction between two imines to form tetrahydropyrimidine products.

See also
 Oxo Diels–Alder reaction
 Imine Diels–Alder reaction

References 

Cycloadditions
Nitrogen heterocycle forming reactions
Name reactions